Gummiryal is a village in Yergatla Mandal, Nizamabad district, Telangana State, India. It is located on the south bank of the Godavari River. The village has many shrines, Including the paatimeedi Hanuman temple, The Sri krishna temple and Old hanuman temple on the bank of the Godavari, The oldest hanuman shrine in the center of the village and Nagendra swami temple is located in Nagendra nagar. 

There is Rashtriya Swayamsevak Sangh (RSS) Shakha(శాఖ) in the village.

The village is a confluence of three districts( Nizamabad(ఇందూరు), Nirmal and Jagityal).

References

Villages in Nizamabad district